The Freehold and Howell Plank Road was a plank road in New Jersey, running south from Freehold into Howell Township. Its path is now roughly followed by New Jersey Route 79, U. S. Route 9 and County Route 524.

The Freehold and Howell Plank Road was chartered March 1, 1853 by an act of the New Jersey Legislature. On June 1, 1901 it was purchased by the Monmouth County Board of Chosen Freeholders and incorporated into the county highway system. Portions were later taken over as a state highway.

See also
List of turnpikes in New Jersey

References

External links
 New Jersey Roads - Route Log - Turnpikes
 N.J. Cultural Resource 1800-1865 by Larrabee

Howell Township, New Jersey
Transportation in Monmouth County, New Jersey
Turnpikes in New Jersey
Plank road